NXT Heatwave was a special episode of WWE's weekly television series NXT, broadcast on the USA Network. It took place on August 16, 2022, at the WWE Performance Center in Orlando, Florida for their NXT brand division. The event was the first Heatwave produced under the WWE banner, as well as the first to be held since 2000 and the eighth overall.

Five matches were contested at the event. In the main event, Bron Breakker defeated JD McDonagh to retain the NXT Championship. In other prominent matches, Tony D'Angelo defeated Santos Escobar in a Street Fight, which banned Escobar from NXT, and in the opening bout, Carmelo Hayes defeated Giovanni Vinci to retain the NXT North American Championship.

Production

Background
Heatwave was the name of a professional wrestling event produced by Eastern/Extreme Championship Wrestling that took place annually from 1994 to 2000. The 1998-2000 iterations of Heatwave aired on pay-per-view (PPV), while the 1997 iteration was an Internet pay-per-view (iPPV). 

On the July 26, 2022, episode of NXT, WWE announced that NXT Heatwave would be held on August 16, effectively reviving the Heatwave name.

Storylines 
The card included matches that resulted from scripted storylines, where wrestlers portrayed villains, heroes, or less distinguishable characters in scripted events that built tension and culminated in a wrestling match or series of matches. Results were predetermined by WWE's writers on the NXT brand, while storylines were played out on NXT's weekly television program NXT and the supplementary online streaming show Level Up.

At NXT: The Great American Bash on July 5, after Bron Breakker's successful NXT Championship defense, he was attacked and put through a table by JD McDonagh. On the August 2 episode of NXT, Breakker and McDonagh signed the contract for their match at Heatwave, with the latter signing it with his blood.

On the July 19 episode of NXT, Zoey Stark, in her first appearance since suffering an injury in November 2021, won a 20-Woman Battle Royal to become the number one contender for Mandy Rose's NXT Women's Championship. The following week, the match was scheduled for Heatwave.

After Cora Jade and Roxanne Perez won the NXT Women's Tag Team Championship at The Great American Bash, Perez cashed in her women's breakout tournament contract on Mandy Rose for the NXT Women's Championship. The match was scheduled for the July 12 episode of NXT, but Perez failed to win the title due to Jade betraying her. The following week, Jade stated that her friendship with Perez was over before throwing her title belt in a trash can. This led to the NXT Women's Tag Team Championship being vacated and a fatal four-way tag team elimination match for the vacant titles being scheduled for the August 2 episode of NXT. On the August 9 episode, Jade lost her match after interference from Perez, who attacked Jade with a kendo stick afterwards. Later that night, a match between Jade and Perez was made official for Heatwave.

In the spring of 2022, Legado Del Fantasma (Santos Escobar, Cruz Del Toro, Elektra Lopez, and Joaquin Wilde) began feuding with The D'Angelo Family (Tony D'Angelo, Channing "Stacks" Lorenzo, and Troy "Two Dimes" Donovan). This led to a six-man tag team match at In Your House on June 4 where The D'Angelo family won, resulting in Legado Del Fantasma joining The D'Angelo Family's stable. With Legado joining The D'Angelo Family, they would accompany each other during matches with them usually losing. On the June 21 episode of NXT, Escobar cost D'Angelo his NXT North American Championship match. At The Great American Bash, D'Angelo revealed that Escobar was hospitalized and the other members of Legado began working with The D'Angelo Family. Escobar returned on the August 2 episode of NXT, where he cost D'Angelo and Lorenzo their NXT Tag Team Championship match, signaling that their alliance has ended. The following week, D'Angelo and Escobar had one final meeting where they agreed to a Street Fight for Heatwave, with the stipulations being that if D'Angelo won, Escobar and the rest of Legado would be banned from NXT, but if Escobar won, Legado would be free from The D'Angelo Family.

On the August 2 episode of NXT, Carmelo Hayes issued an open challenge for the NXT North American Championship. Giovanni Vinci accepted, but was attacked by Nathan Frazer, who answered the challenge himself. Hayes retained after interference from Vinci. The following week, a match between Vinci and Hayes for the title was scheduled for Heatwave.

Event

Preliminary matches
The television special began with Carmelo Hayes (accompanied by Trick Williams) defending the NXT North American Championship against Giovanni Vinci. During the match, Vinci attempted a suplex on Hayes, but botched it. Vinci adjusted and performed a brainbuster on Hayes for a nearfall. Hayes performed a Final Cut Suplex on Vinci for a nearfall. Vinci performed a moonsault on Hayes, but Williams placed Hayes' foot on the bottom rope to void the pin. In the climax, Vinci powerbombed Williams onto Hayes. Vinci then performed a Spirit Bomb on Williams and looked to do the same to Hayes, but Hayes reversed into a headscissors takedown to retain the title.

Following this, Diamond Mine (Roderick Strong, Damon Kemp, and NXT Tag Team Champions Julius Creed and Brutus Creed) made their appearance to talk about The Creed Brothers' (Brutus and Julius) success in WWE, only for Gallus (Mark Coffey, Joe Coffey, and Wolfgang) to attack them and stand tall to end the segment.

In the second match, Roxanne Perez took on Cora Jade. In the closing moments, Jade took a kendo stick, but missed Perez. Perez then took the kendo stick and was about to hit Jade with it, but decided not to. Jade took advantage with a DDT onto the kendo stick to win the match.

Afterwards, a backstage segment took place where NXT UK Tag Team Champions Josh Briggs and Brooks Jensen were interrupted by Gallus (Joe Coffey, Mark Coffey, and Wolfgang). A brawl between the two teams followed, setting up a match between the two teams for the NXT UK Tag Team Championship for the following week.

In the third match, Santos Escobar (accompanied by Elektra Lopez, Cruz Del Toro, and Joaquin Wilde) took on Tony D'Angelo (accompanied by Channing "Stacks" Lorenzo) in a street fight. Lorenzo performed a suicide dive on Wilde and Toro outside the ring. Escobar went for the Arrow From the Depths of Hell dive, but D'Angelo intercepted it with a trash can lid shot. Lopez slapped D'Angelo, and Escobar took him out with an Arrow From the Depths of Hell. Toro distracted D'Angelo, allowing Escobar to roll him up for a nearfall. In the climax, as Lopez gave a crowbar to Escobar, D'Angelo tackled her. D'Angelo followed up with a low blow on Escobar, who recovered and performed a twisting thrust kick on D'Angelo when D'Angelo brought the crowbar in the ring. Escobar retrieved brass knuckles and D'Angelo had a crowbar, and D'Angelo struck Escobar with the crowbar first to win the match. As a result, Escobar and the rest of Legado were gone from NXT.

In the penultimate match, Mandy Rose (with Gigi Dolin and Jacy Jayne) defended the NXT Women's Championship against Zoey Stark. Rose slammed Stark's injured leg into the announce table. Dolin and Jayne tripped up Stark. The referee saw this and ejected them from ringside. Afterwards, Dolin and Jayne were sent backstage by Nikkita Lyons. Throughout the remainder of the match, Rose focused on Stark's injured leg. Stark was able to perform the Tilt-a-whirl GTS on Rose, but couldn't capitalize due to the injury, allowing Rose to roll out of the ring. Rose then took of Stark's knee brace and attempted a Bicycle Knee, but Stark countered into a roll-up for a nearfall. In the closing moments, Rose performed a Bicycle Knee on Stark for a nearfall, after which, Rose put the knee brace on before performing a second Bicycle Knee, with an assist from the knee brace, to retain the title.

Main event
In the main event, Bron Breakker defended the NXT Championship against JD McDonagh. The two started with a chain wrestling sequence that was dominated by Breakker. McDonagh sidestepped a Spear attempt from Breakker, who crashed into the ring post. McDonagh then applied a crossface on Breakker, who made it to the rope to escape. McDonagh performed a Spanish Fly suplex on Breakker and followed up with a brainbuster for a nearfall. In the climax, McDonagh attempted a moonsault, but Breakker avoided it and performed a Spear on McDonagh, who rolled out of the ring to avoid being pinned. When McDonagh returned to the ring, Breakker performed a second Spear on McDonagh, who dared Breakker to perform another. Breakker followed up with a Military Press Powerslam on McDonagh to retain the title. After the match, Breakker was confronted by NXT UK Champion Tyler Bate. The two then held their respective championships in the air as the show ended.

Aftermath
NXT Champion Bron Breakker opened the following episode of NXT to talk about the NXT UK invasion at Heatwave, and being confronted by NXT UK Champion Tyler Bate at the end of the event when Bate interrupted. The two then agreed to a championship unification match for Worlds Collide, where Breakker won to unify the titles.

JD McDonagh would stay in the NXT Championship picture. On the September 20 episode of NXT, he defeated Tyler Bate to earn a rematch against NXT Champion Bron Breakker at a future date. Afterwards, he was confronted by Breakker and Ilja Dragunov, setting up a triple threat match between the three for the NXT Championship at Halloween Havoc.

Cora Jade and Roxanne Perez would also continue their rivalry. On the October 4 episode of NXT, they were guests on the Waller Effect, which was hosted by Grayson Waller. Waller announced another match between the two at Halloween Havoc as a Weapons Wild match after he spun the wheel with it landing on "Weapons Wild".

Gallus (Mark Coffey and Wolfgang) (with Joe Coffey) and Josh Briggs and Brooks Jensen (with Fallon Henley) had their match for the NXT UK Tag Team Championship on the following episode of NXT. The ending came when Lash Legend attacked Henley, leading to Pretty Deadly (Kit Wilson and Elton Prince) brawling with Briggs and Jensen outside the ring. As a result, Gallus won via countout, but Briggs and Jensen retained. The following week, Briggs and Jensen teamed with Henley to take on Wilson, Prince, and Legend in a winning effort after interference from Mark and Wolfgang. Later that night, after Mark, Joe, and Wolfgang defeated Damon Kemp and NXT Tag Team Champions The Creed Brothers (Brutus Creed and Julius Creed), a brawl between the two teams broke out, and Pretty Deadly and Briggs and Jensen got involved in the brawl, leading to a fatal four-way tag team elimination match between the four teams to unify the NXT and NXT UK Tag Team Championships being made official for Worlds Collide.

This ended up being Giovanni Vinci's final NXT appearance, as at Clash at the Castle on September 3, Vinci made his main roster debut, where he and Ludwig Kaiser accompanied Gunther (who defended his Intercontinental Championship against Sheamus at the event), reforming Imperium in the process.

On the following episode of NXT, Santos Escobar picked up the rest of Legado Del Fantasma (Cruz Del Toro, Joaquin Wilde, and Elektra Lopez) and drove away from the Performance Center with them, signaling the end of their time in NXT. They were then promoted to the main roster on SmackDown and debuted on the October 7 episode of SmackDown with a returning Zelina Vega replacing Lopez, who stayed in NXT.

Results

See also

2022 in professional wrestling
List of WWE NXT special episodes

References

External links 
 

2022 in professional wrestling in Florida
2022 in professional wrestling
Events in Orlando, Florida
Heat Wave
August 2022 events in the United States
Professional wrestling in Orlando, Florida
WWE NXT